The 1991–92 Polska Liga Hokejowa season was the 57th season of the Polska Liga Hokejowa, the top level of ice hockey in Poland. 10 teams participated in the league, and Unia Oswiecim won the championship.

First round

Final round

Qualification round

Playoffs

Quarterfinals 
 Polonia Bytom - GKS Katowice 2:1 (2:0, 1:6, 5:1)
 Unia Oświęcim - Towimor Torun 2:1 (8:1, 3:4, 3:0)
 Podhale Nowy Targ - KS Cracovia 2:0 (3:2, 3:1)
 Naprzód Janów - GKS Tychy 2:0 (3:2, 5:3)

Semifinals
 Polonia Bytom - Unia Oświęcim 2:3 (5:0, 1:5, 5:2, 2:3, 2:3)
 Podhale Nowy Targ - Naprzód Janów 1:3 (3:2, 1:2, 2:3 SO, 2:4)

Final 
 Unia Oświęcim - Naprzód Janów 3:2 (6:4, 4:7, 4:3, 2:3, 7:1)

Placing round

7th place 
 GKS Tychy - Towimor Torun 3:5/4:4

5th place 
 GKS Katowice - KS Cracovia 5:6/2:5

3rd place 
 Podhale Nowy Targ - Polonia Bytom 3:0 (7:2, 4:2, 3:2)

External links
 Season on hockeyarchives.info

1991-92
Pol
Polska